This is a list of blizzards, arranged alphabetically by continent. A blizzard is defined as a severe snowstorm characterized by strong sustained winds of at least  and lasting for three hours or more. The list states blizzards in various countries since 1972.

Africa

Asia

Australia

Europe

North America

South America

See also
 List of ice storms
 List of costly or deadly hailstorms
 List of dust storms with visibility of 1/4 mile or less, or meters or less
 List of weather records
 Lowest temperature recorded on Earth

References

Weather hazards
Severe weather and convection